The Bisu T3 is a 5-seat subcompact CUV produced by Bisu Auto, a brand of the Chonqing Bisu Automotive Corporation, which is closely related to Beiqi-Yinxiang, a joint venture between Beijing Auto (Beiqi) and the Yinxiang Group.

Overview 

The Bisu T3 was officially launched on the Chinese car market in Q1 2017 with prices ranging from 74.900 yuan to 89,900 yuan. The Bisu T3 was formerly known as the Bisu S25 during development phase, with the platform coming from the Beiqi-Yinxiang Huansu S2 and Huansu S3 CUVs.

References

External links 

 Bisu Official Website

T3
Cars introduced in 2017
Crossover sport utility vehicles
front-wheel-drive vehicles
2010s cars
Cars of China